Henri Mathé (1837-1907) was a French politician.

Early life
Henri Mathé was born on May 27, 1837 in Moulins, in rural France. His father died when he was three years old, and he was adopted by his paternal uncle, Antoine Félix Mathé. He had a brother, Félix Mathé.

He graduated from the ESCP Europe, a business school in Paris.

Career
He served as a member of the Chamber of Deputies from 1885 to 1893.

Personal life
He married Jeanne Elisa Billot.

Death
He died on October 27, 1907 in Paris, France.

References

1837 births
1907 deaths
Politicians from Moulins, Allier
French republicans
Members of the 4th Chamber of Deputies of the French Third Republic
Members of the 5th Chamber of Deputies of the French Third Republic